Trekkopje is a mountain in the Erongo Region of Namibia,   north-east of Swakopmund on the road to Usakos.

History

The Swakopmund–Windhoek railway line goes past the mountain. Today the railway station no longer stands, and the railway stop is not in use anymore, either.

Trekkopje was the site of the Battle of Trekkopjes, a World War I battle aimed at preventing South African troops from rebuilding the railway line. A war cemetery, Trekkopje Cemetery features 16 graves of railway protection troops from this battle.

Trekkopje mine
Trekkopje desalination plant is in turn named after the mine, as it was built to provide the mine with water. The desalination plant is situated at the Atlantic coast near Wlotzkasbaken.

References

Erongo Region
Railway stations in Namibia